Manba may refer to:
Beta-mannosidase, an enzyme
A branch of the alternative fashion trend Ganguro